BareBabies is a retailer of high-end baby products headquartered in Orem, Utah.

History
BareBabies began in 2000 as an ecommerce site based out of Huntington Beach, California. In 2002 they expanded into retail sales and opened their first location in Huntington Beach, California. BareBabies.com quickly grew to become one of the largest online high-end baby product retailers.

In 2007 BareBabies and its founder were only one of four businesses recognized by Yahoo! Small Business and featured on its front page as a part of their Real Entrepreneurs, Real inspiration series. Entrepreneur Magazine also highlighted the company and the owner in 2004.

BareBabies Inc, filed for bankruptcy on June 6, 2008 and subsequently shut down their retail location. In November 2008 the domain names and website were acquired by Sell Right and all operations were moved to Orem, Utah. The BareBabies business is currently a subsidiary of the Baby and Toddler Company.

External links
BareBabies Web site

References

Companies based in Orem, Utah
2000 establishments in California